Dirk Stoltz (born 26 February 1969), is a South African actor. He is most notable for the roles in the films Safe House, Witness to a Kill, Stander and the soap opera 7de Laan.

Career
He started drama career since early 1990s, starring in many local productions. His first television serial is Mooirivier telecast in 1990. Then he acted in many serials such as Song vir Katryn, Riemvasmaak and Erfsondes, all were telecast on SABC2 as well as Afrikaans-language television drama serials: Arsenaal, Die Vierde Kabinet, Iemand om lief te Hê, Triptiek, Plek van die Vleisvreters and Swartwater. In 2001, he made the film debut with Witness to a Kill and later acted in many films such as Red Dust, Superhelde, Stander, Safehouse and Prinses. From 2007 to 2012, he appeared in the Afrikaans drama series Erfsondes. In 2009, he played the starring role of "Mikey" in the SABC2 sitcom Askies.

Apart from that, he also made some stand-up comedy and worked in New Zealand as well. In 2021 he joined the cast of popular soapie 7de laan.

Filmography

References

External links
 

Living people
South African male television actors
1969 births